Alex Albert Beehler is a professor, lawyer, and former senior American government official, who served as the Assistant Secretary of the Army for Installations, Energy and Environment between 2019 and 2021.

Career
In 1975, Alex Beehler gained a Bachelor of Arts from Princeton University, before gaining a Juris Doctor from the University of Virginia School of Law in 1978. Subsequently, he spent 25 years practicing law, both in a private environment, and across a number of federal agencies including the Department of Justice's Environmental Enforcement Section. Prior to joining the Department of Defense, Beehler served concurrently as the Director of Environmental and Regulatory Affairs at Koch Industries, and as the Vice President for Environmental Projects at the Charles G. Koch Foundation. Between 2004 and 2009, Beehler served in the Department Defense, firstly as the Assistant Deputy Under Secretary of Defense for Environment, Safety and Occupational Health, and then later as the Acting Deputy Under Secretary of Defense for Installations & Environment. He also was the inaugural Chief Sustainability Officer of the department. After leaving the DoD Beehler worked for FaegreBD Consulting, providing environment, energy, and sustainability advice to government agencies; however in 2018, he was nominated to serve as the 8th Assistant Secretary of the Army for Installations, Energy and Environment within the Department of the Army, and was sworn in on January 20, 2019. He served in this role until the beginning of Joe Biden's presidency.

Beehler remains a member of the District of Columbia Bar, Maryland State Bar Association, and Virginia State Bar.

Personal life
Beehler is married to Stephanie, and has two adult children.

References

Living people
Year of birth missing (living people)
Assistant Secretaries of the Army for Installations, Energy and Environment
Trump administration personnel
George W. Bush administration personnel
Princeton University alumni
University of Virginia School of Law alumni